The KBL Best 5 (Korean: 베스트 5) an annual honor bestowed on the best players in the Korean Basketball League following every season. The honor is analogous to the "All-NBA Team" in the NBA or "Team of the Year" in association football. Voting is conducted by a panel of KBL-registered reporters and journalists who exclusively cover the sport. Both domestic and foreign players are eligible for selection.

"One-club man" Yang Dong-geun holds the all-time record for the most number of selections, with nine, and Seo Jang-hoon and Kim Joo-sung are jointly ranked second, with eight selections. Moon Tae-jong and his younger brother Moon Tae-young were both selected for the 2013–14 season's Best 5, the only occasion where a pair of brothers were simultaneously selected. Heo Ung and Heo Hoon are the only other pair of brothers who have been voted into the Best 5, albeit on separate occasions.

Selections

1997 to 2018–19
From the inception of the honor, voters have selected two guards, two forwards and a center. Best 5 teams are listed according to their positions in the following descending order: two guards, two forwards and a center. The positions are generally the position the player is registered as with the KBL but "swingman" players may be listed under the position they played the most in for that particular season, resulting several players being voted into the Best 5 on different occasions in different positions.

2019–20 to present
From the 2019–20 season onwards, the season's five best players are selected by voters without regard to position. The five players who received the most votes are selected. Players are listed in descending order by number of votes received.

Multi-time winners

Notes

References

External Links
Korean Basketball League Official Website 

Korean Basketball League awards